The Iran Fajr International in badminton is an international open held in Tehran, Iran and a part of the Fajr decade festival. This tournament is one of the eldest tournament in the Western Asia which was formerly known as Ten Days of Dawn in commemoration of the 1979 Islamic Revolution, a ten-day celebration of Ruhollah Khomeini's return to Iran.

Previous winners

Performances by nation

References 

 
Badminton tournaments in Iran